In India, a medical college is an educational institution that provides medical education. These institutions may vary from stand-alone colleges that train doctors to conglomerates that offer training related in all aspects of medical care. The term is synonymous with "medical school" as used in the US and some other countries. MBBS is a degree in medicine established by Indian Medical Council Act 1956 and continued in National Medical Commission Act 2019. After MBBS, doctors register with state medical councils. Before the passage of NMC Act 2019, they had the option of registering with the Medical Council of India [MCI] too.

Recognition
Indian law requires these institutions to be recognized by the National Medical Commission The Indian government keeps an updated list of these approved medical colleges. Many persons without MBBS degrees practice like doctors in India. They are called quacks. According to National Medical Commission Act 2019, punishment for quackery has been enhanced to up to 1 year imprisonment and up to INR 5 lakh fine.

Admissions and education 

The standard entry-to-practice degree in modern medicine in India is the Bachelor of Medicine and Bachelor of Surgery (MBS), credential earned upon completion of a five-and-a-half-year undergraduate program. The curriculum is divided into one year of preclinical studies in general science subjects and three and a half years of paraclinical and clinical studies, followed by a one-year clinical internship. Before beginning the internship, students are required to pass several examinations, the final one of which is conducted in two parts. Graduate education in medical science typically takes three additional years of study after the MBBS and concludes with the award of the Master of Surgery or Doctor of MedicinePostgraduate diplomas in medical specializations may also be awarded upon the completion of two-year training programs

Medical college 
According to the World Federation for Medical Education, India is the country with the geatest quantity of operational medical schools (392). A list of schools by region is provided below:

By region

By state

References

External links
 National Board of Examinations

 
Medical education in India